Projection areas are areas in the four lobes (frontal, parietal, temporal, occipital) of the brain where sensory processing occurs.

References
Sternberg, Robert J. (2006): Cognitive Psychology. 4th Ed. Thomson Wadsworth.

Cerebrum